Gideon Louis Boissevain (October 4, 1870 - April 25, 1924) was president of the Hilliard Hotel Company and on the board of directors for the Knickerbocker Trust Company.

Biography
He was born on October 4, 1870 in Amsterdam to Johannes Boissevain and Johanna Juliane Hoek.

He married Arabella Helen Magee in 1899. She was the daughter Emma S. and George J. Magee.

In 1906 their house in New Castle, New York was robbed and $10,000 worth of jewelry was taken.

He died on April 25, 1924 in Manhattan.

He was buried on Berkeley Memorial Cemetery in Middletown, Rhode Island.

Footnotes

External links

Gideon Louis Boissevain at Findagrave

1870 births
1924 deaths
Knickerbocker Trust Company
Businesspeople from Amsterdam
Businesspeople from New York (state)